The 2017–18 season of the Turkish Women's First Football League is the 22nd season of Turkey's premier women's football league.

The league season started with the first week matches on 12 November 2017. The regular season concluded with the 18th week matches on 8 April. 2018. Ten teams competed with two promoted teams, Fatih Vatan Spor of Istanbul and Amed Sportif Faaliyetler  from Diyarbakır, which replaced the relegated teams Adana İdmanyurduspor and Amasya Eğitim Spor. Four teams from Istanbul took part in the 2017–18 season.

Ataşehir Belediyespor became the league champion two matches before the league's end, regaining the title from Konak Belediyespor, who held the title five seasons in a row. This is the third title of the Istanbul-based team in their history. Ataşehir Belediyespor took part at the 2018–19 UEFA Women's Champions League qualifying round.

Konak Belediyespor and Beşiktaş J.K. finished the regular season of 2017–18 even on points behind the champion Ataşehir Belediyespor. The regular time of the play-off match between the two teams on April 22, 2018 ended with 1–1 draw. In the extension time, Beşiktaş J.K. scored three penalty goals, finished the match by 4–1, and became so runners-up.

Teams

Team changes

League table

Results

1 – won by default
2 – default

Play-off for runners-up
Konak Belediyespor 1–4 Beşiktaş J.K.

Top goalscorers

.

Hat-tricks

References

External links
 Kadınlar 1. Ligi 2017–18 Sezonu 

2017
2017–18 domestic women's association football leagues
Women's First League